United Kingdom military aircraft serial numbers are aircraft registration numbers used to identify individual military aircraft in the United Kingdom (UK).  All UK military aircraft are allocated and display a unique registration number.  A unified registration number system, maintained initially by the Air Ministry (AM), and its successor the Ministry of Defence (MoD), is used for aircraft operated by the Royal Air Force (RAF), Fleet Air Arm (FAA), and Army Air Corps (AAC).  Military aircraft operated by government agencies and civilian contractors (for example QinetiQ) are also assigned registration numbers from this system.

When the Royal Flying Corps (RFC) was formed in 1912, its aircraft were identified by a letter/number system related to the manufacturer.  The prefix 'A' was allocated to balloons of No.1 Company, Air Battalion, Royal Engineers, the prefix 'B' to aeroplanes of No.2 Company, and the prefix 'F' to aeroplanes of the Central Flying School.  The Naval Wing used the prefix 'H' for seaplanes ('Hydroaeroplanes' as they were then known), 'M' for monoplanes, and 'T' for aeroplanes with engines mounted in tractor configuration.  Before the end of the first year, a unified aircraft registration number system was introduced for both Army and Naval aircraft.

The registration numbers are allocated at the time the contract for supply is placed with the aircraft manufacturer or supplier.

In an RAF or FAA pilot's personal service log book, the registration number of any aircraft flown, along with any other particulars, such as aircraft type, flight duration, purpose of flight, etc., is entered by the pilot after every flight, thus giving a complete record of the pilot's flying activities and which individual aircraft have been flown.

1 to 10000

This first series ran from 1 to 10000 with blocks allocated to each service.  The first registration number was allocated to a Short S.34 for the Royal Naval Air Service (RNAS), with the number 10000 going to a Blackburn-built B.E.2c aircraft in 1916.

A1 to Z9999
By 1916, the first sequence had reached 10000, and it was decided to start an alpha-numeric system from A1 (allocated to a Royal Aircraft Factory BE.2d) to A9999 then starting again at B1.  The letters A, B, C, D, E, F, H, and J were allocated to the Royal Flying Corps (RFC), and N1 to N9999 and S1 to S9999 to the Royal Naval Air Service (RNAS).  When the sequence reached the prefix K it was decided to start at K1000 for all subsequent letters instead of K1.

Although the N and S series had earlier been used by RNAS aircraft, the sequence N1000 to N9999 was again used by the Air Ministry for both RAF and RN aircraft.  The 'Naval' S sequence had reached only S1865, a Fairey IIIF, but when R9999 was reached in 1939, the next serial allocations did not run on from that point, but instead commenced at T1000.

From 1937, not all aircraft registration numbers were allocated, in order to hide the true number of aircraft in production and service.  Gaps in the serial number sequence were sometimes referred to as "blackout blocks".  The first example of this practice was an early 1937 order for 200 Avro Manchester bombers which were allotted the serials L7276-7325, L7373-7402, L7415-7434, L7453-7497, L7515-7549 and L7565-7584, covering a range of 309 possible serial numbers, and thus making it difficult for an enemy to estimate true British military aircraft strength.

AA100 to ZZ999

By 1940, the registration number Z9978 had been allocated to a Bristol Blenheim, and it was decided to restart the sequence with a two-letter prefix, starting at AA100.  This sequence is still in use today.  Until the 1990s this two-letter, three-numeral registration number sequence, had numbers in the range 100 to 999.  An exception to this rule was a Douglas Skyraider AEW1 which received the UK serial WT097, which incorporated the last three digits of its US Navy Bureau Number 124097.  Recently, past unassigned registration numbers, including those having numerals 001-099, have been assigned.

Some letters have not been used to avoid confusion: C confusion with G, I confusion with 1, O and Q confusion with 0, U confusion with V and Y confusion with X.

During the Second World War, RAF aircraft carrying secret equipment, or that were in themselves secret, such as certain military prototypes, had a '/G' suffix added to the end of the registration number, the 'G' signifying 'Guard', denoting that the aircraft was to have an armed guard at all times while on the ground, for example; W4041/G, the prototype Gloster E.28/39 jet powered by the Whittle engine, LZ548/G, the prototype de Havilland Vampire jet fighter, or ML926/G,  a de Havilland Mosquito XVI experimentally fitted with H2S radar.

As of 2009, registration number allocations have reached the ZKnnn range.  However since about the year 2000 registration numbers have increasingly been allocated out-of-sequence.  For example, the first RAF C-17 Globemaster was given the registration number ZZ171 in 2001, and a batch of Britten-Norman Defenders for the Army Air Corps (AAC) were given registration numbers in the ZGnnn range in 2003 (the last ZG serial being allocated more than 14 years previously).  Also, some recent registration number allocations have had a numeric part in the previously-unused 001 to 099 range.

'Maintenance' registration numbers
Distinct registration numbering systems are used to identify non-flying airframes used for ground training.  The RAF have used a numeric sequence with an 'M' suffix sometimes referred to as the 'Maintenance' series.  Known allocations, made between 1921 and 2000, ranged from 540M to 9344M, when this sequence was terminated.  The main series of single letter serials did not use 'M' to avoid confusion with the suffix 'M'.  The Fleet Air Arm use an 'A'-prefixed sequence (e.g. A2606), and the Army Air Corps issue 'TAD' numbers to their instructional airframes (e.g. TAD015).

Display

The registration numbers are normally carried in up to four places on each aircraft; on either side of the aircraft on a vertical surface, and on the underside of each wing.  The under-wing registration numbers, originally specified so that in case of unauthorised low flying civilian personnel could report the offending aircraft to the local police, have not been displayed since the 1960s, as by then jet aircraft speeds at low level had made the likelihood of a person on the ground being able to read, and thus report them, increasingly remote.  The registration number on each side is usually on the rear fuselage, but this can vary depending on the aircraft type, for instance the delta winged Gloster Javelin had the registration number on the forward engine nacelle, and the Avro Vulcan had the registration number on its tail fin.  Helicopters have only carried registration numbers on each side, either on the tail-boom or rear fuselage.

See also
United Kingdom aircraft registration
United Kingdom aircraft test serials
British military aircraft designation systems
Royal Air Force roundels
List of RAF Squadron Codes
United States military aircraft serials

References

British Military Aircraft and Markings Second Edition, British Aviation Research Group, 1983, 
"The Short Seaplanes:Historical Military Aircraft No. 14 Part I",  J. M. Bruce, Flight, 14 December 1956. pp. 921–926.
Royal Air Force Aircraft L1000-N9999, J.J.Halley, Air-Britain, 1993,  and other similar volumes covering all serial allocations from J1000 to XZ999.
Aircraft Markings of the World 1912-1967, Bruce Robertson, Harleyford Publications, 1967.
British Military Aircraft Serials 1912-1969, Bruce Robertson, Ian Allan, 1969, SBN 7110-0091-3

External links
UK Serials Resource Centre — UK Military Aircraft Serial Allocations
"British Military Serial Numbers" — a 1955 Flight article
RAF Aircraft Serial Numbers — query-able database from RAFCommands.com

British military aircraft
Serial numbers
Aircraft markings